The Stripper is a Brazilian LGBTQ + drama web series, based on the homonymous short story by author Evelin Silva. Success in Brazil, the series has more than 30 million views on YouTube. The series stars Natalie Smith, Priscilla Pugliesi and Rodrigo Tardelli and produced by Brazilian production company Ponto Ação. The tale The Stripper has over 18 million views on Wattpad. Due to the great success of the first season, the series had the second and third season renewed.

Synopsis
Camila begins to experience financial difficulties so she has the opportunity to work at a nightclub called Imperium as Karla, the Stripper. During the day, however, she stills works as an assistant and her new boss, the powerful and mysterious Lauren, can't know Camila is actually also Karla, the stripper she has become obsessed with.

Cast 
Natalie Smith as  Karla/Camila
Priscilla Pugliese as Lauren
Maria Clara El-Bainy as Dinah
Nathália Diório as Allyson
Luiza César (Veronica)
Rodrigo Tardelli (Wesley)
Lorena Antunes (Kellen)
Rodrigo Ferraro (Austin)
Valéria Bohm (Candence)
Jessica Córes (Normani)
Madu de Paoli (Sofia)
Camilla Rocha (Taylor)
Thaisa Lima (Alexa)
Tiago Deam (Leandro)
Tom Reis (Troy)
Vitor Zenezi (Alfred)

Special guests
Lu Grimaldi (Germana)
Nadia Bambirra (Clara)
Valéria Alencar (Sinu)
Alexandre Mello (Michael)
João Vitti (Alejandro)
Jorge Jeronymo (Richard)

Awards and nominations

References

External links

Brazilian LGBT-related television shows